Nefedovo is a rural locality (a village) in Novlenskoye Rural Settlement, Vologodsky District, Vologda Oblast, Russia. The population was 250 as of 2002. There are 5 streets.

Geography 
Nefedovo is located 82 km northwest of Vologda (the district's administrative centre) by road. Malgino is the nearest rural locality.

References 

Rural localities in Vologodsky District